Mirza Ali Baig (born 10 July 1983) is a Pakistani high-altitude mountaineer and the first Pakistani man to summit all seven highest peaks in seven continents. Also, Mirza is a professional tourism expert, he is the pioneer who introduced extreme sports to women in Pakistan and made several documentaries related to the extreme adventure in Pakistan particularly women in mountaineering and outdoor.

Early life and career
Mirza Ali grew up and was raised in the remote village of Shimshal. After passing his 8th grade exams in the village, he moved to the town of Gulmit for high school. Mirza Ali while in high school worked with foreign trekking groups and expeditions as a porter. He had his first mountain climb at the young age of 16 at Mingligh Sar (6050m) in Shimshal Pamir. Since then he has lived out his love for the outdoors in multiple climbing expeditions, besides continuing his education in Karachi where he acquired his bachelor of Commerce from Karachi University.

Working in different capacity in tourism industry, he joined his other cousins to work as high altitude porter. He observed there are less local people exploring the mountains, valleys, passes and beautiful glaciers of Pakistan. He also didn't find any major local expeditions or mountain related tours in Gilgit-Baltistan, most ironic he found women participation in outdoor sports such as mountain expeditions almost zero.

He also worked for women empowerment and gender equality through mountain adventure. His lifetime achievement was when his sister reached the summit of Mt. Everest on 19 May 2013 being the first female from Pakistan to do so.

Pioneer of Women adventure/Gender Equality
Mirza Ali started his campaign to encourage women in outdoor sports and mountaineering, though meager resources it took him long, until 2009, when he was able to organize an expedition to 7000m peak where a girl from Lahore also took part, from there Mirza Ali continuously organized various expedition with his sister. It was Mirza's encouragement and planning that made possible for Samina Baig to reach the summit of Mount Everest.

As a photographer his photos were exhibited by the US embassy in Islamabad and his adventure documentaries "SAMINA, Muhim Chashkin Sar"  and ”Ugli Rut ki Dastak” short film/ promotional AD for Gender Equity are aired from nearly all mainstream TV channels in Pakistan. Mirza climbing missions are not just to reach the summit but reaching a purpose and mission, the gist of his climbing’s are based on Gender equality, women empowerment, his sacrifice to let his sister to the summit of Mt. Everest without him, when they were just 248m short form the summit is a great lesson of women empowerment to other fellow Pakistani men.

7 Summits 7 Continents
After Everest expedition for Gender equality and women empowerment, he created yet another project 7 Summits 7 Continents. For Adventure diplomacy, connecting people through Mountains, thus Mirza could bring 5 embassies together to be support group as “Adventure Diplomacy Support Group” Mirza Ali went on this Diplomacy expedition with his sister to conquer the 7 highest peaks in 7 continents and within eight months Samina Baig conquered all 7 Mountains while Mount Everest remains to be conquered by Mirza Ali, If Mirza Ali conquers Mount Everest they going to be the first siblings accomplish this feat. Mirza Ali is trying to show positive face of Pakistan and brave face of Pakistani women.

Beyond The Heights
Beyond the Heights is a documentary about Samina Baig's journey from her remote mountain village to the top of Mount Everest. It was premiered on 5 March 2015 in Islamabad and was released on limited screens around Pakistan.

Other works

Pakistan Youth Outreach
Mirza Ali founded an NGO Pakistan Youth Outreach which aims to promote Gender Equality through education and adventure sports among youth and women in Pakistan. Mirza is providing training and organizing expeditions for students of various schools, colleges and universities, of Pakistan putting his entire effort to bring mountaineering as sports in Pakistan.

School in Arandu
In 2011, Mirza Ali decided to start the project of school in Arandu. This school provides education to 450 boys and girls.

National Youth Skiing Camp
In January 2015 first ever National Youth Skiing Camp was organized by Mirza Ali with the strong support from Stephen Keck and Andreas Ehrensberger from Austria. Around 33 participants from various parts of Pakistan came to the ski camp.

List of Mountains climbed

References

External links 
Mirza Ali's Blog
Pakistan Youth Outreach
Karakorum Expedition
Facebook
Twitter

Living people
Pakistani mountain climbers
Pakistani summiters of Mount Everest
People from Hunza-Nagar District
Pakistani Ismailis
1983 births